Chungshin Girls' High School is a private girls high school located in Jamsil-dong, Songpa-gu, Seoul.

Notable alumni
 Han Myeong-sook, first female Prime Minister of South Korea
 Choi Soo-young, singer and member of girl group Girls' Generation
 Son Hye-Ju, singer and member of girl group Loona
 Choi Ye-rim, singer and member of girl group Loona
 Go Ara, actress
 Hyun Seung-min, actress
 Kim Min-ja, actress
 Lee Hyo-jeong (1983), actress
 Im Seong-min (1969), actress and former KBS announcer
 Park So-dam, movie actress
 Onjo, movie actress
 Shin Yoon-joo, KBS announcer
 Ji Young-seo, former KBS announcer and current Halla University professor 
 Hwang In-ja, politician
 Kim Mal-bong, novelist
 Kim Yun-mi, speed skater
 Kim Eun-hye, broadcaster and politician

References

External links
 

High schools in South Korea
Educational institutions established in 1887
1887 establishments in Korea
High schools in Seoul
Girls' schools in South Korea